Kwasi Owusu-Yeboa is a Ghanaian diplomat and a member of the New Patriotic Party of Ghana. He is currently Ghana's ambassador to Togo.

Ambassadorial appointment 
In July 2017, President Nana Akuffo-Addo named Kwasi Owusu-Yeboa as Ghana's ambassador to Togo. He was among twenty two other distinguished Ghanaians who were named to head various diplomatic Ghanaian mission in the world.

References

Year of birth missing (living people)
Living people
Ambassadors of Ghana to Togo
New Patriotic Party politicians